Drozdowo may refer to the following places in Poland:
 Drozdowo, Kuyavian-Pomeranian Voivodeship (north-central Poland)
 Drozdowo, Maków County in Masovian Voivodeship (east-central Poland)
 Drozdowo, Podlaskie Voivodeship (north-east Poland)
 Drozdowo, Płońsk County in Masovian Voivodeship (east-central Poland)
 Drozdowo, Człuchów County in Pomeranian Voivodeship (north Poland)
 Drozdowo, Kartuzy County in Pomeranian Voivodeship (north Poland)
 Drozdowo, Olecko County in Warmian-Masurian Voivodeship (north Poland)
 Drozdowo, Pisz County in Warmian-Masurian Voivodeship (north Poland)
 Drozdowo, Gryfice County in West Pomeranian Voivodeship (north-west Poland)
 Drozdowo, Gryfino County in West Pomeranian Voivodeship (north-west Poland)
 Drozdowo, Kołobrzeg County in West Pomeranian Voivodeship (north-west Poland)
 Drozdowo, Sławno County in West Pomeranian Voivodeship (north-west Poland)